frank: sonnets by Diane Seuss was the winner of the 2022 Pulitzer Prize for Poetry published by Graywolf Press. The Pulitzer committee described frank: sonnets as "a virtuosic collection that inventively expands the sonnet form to confront the messy contradictions of contemporary America, including the beauty and the difficulty of working-class life in the Rust Belt."

References

2021 poetry books
American poetry collections
Graywolf Press books
Pulitzer Prize for Poetry-winning works